Pribrezhny is a rural locality (a settlement) in Zamyansky Selsoviet of Yenotayevsky District, Astrakhan Oblast, Russia. The population was 107 as of 2010. There are 6 streets.

Geography 
Pribrezhny is located 244 km southeast of Yenotayevka (the district's administrative centre) by road. Zamyany is the nearest rural locality.

References 

Rural localities in Yenotayevsky District